Private Snafu in The Aleutians—Isles of Enchantment (Oh Brother!) is a short cartoon in the Private Snafu series, directed by Chuck Jones. Warner Bros. produced this film for the United States armed forces and issued it to service branches in February 1945, to inform personnel posted in the Aleutian Islands of what was then the Alaska Territory.

The film describes the hardships of a posting in the Aleutians, describing the severe climatic conditions in an ironic voiceover commentary. During the Aleutian Islands Campaign in World War II, thousands of U.S. servicemen were stationed in the islands.

Description
 
The film begins by describing how the Aleutian Islands were considered a "back door to the United States," resulting in the Aleutian Islands Campaign, after which the islands are now "a front door to Tokyo."  It goes on to describe the harsh and widely varying environment—rain, snow, thunder, whirlwind gales—which the narrator attributes to Mother Nature: “the old bag blew her top!” The narrator also describes the conditions as "almost unbelievable," to which an observing elephant seal replies with Jimmy Durante style, "Nevertheless, that's the conditions that prevail."

Two servicemen emerge from thick mud riding on what appears to be another serviceman. A "williwaw" strikes suddenly, stripping buildings and even hills off the landscape. Difficulty of airstrip maintenance due to excess moisture is the next topic; airmen (including Private Snafu, in his lone appearance in the short, donning a diving suit) dive into a pond to retrieve a B-17. The aircraft rises from water and takes flight, opening its bomb bay to discharge a fish. This animal drops into the gaping maw of the seal, who repeats his earlier dialogue.

External links

1945 films
1945 animated films
Articles containing video clips
Private Snafu
Short films directed by Chuck Jones
Films set in Alaska
Films set in Tokyo
Anti-Japanese sentiment
Pacific War films
Films scored by Carl Stalling
1945 comedy films
1940s Warner Bros. animated short films